107.5 Win FM (DWIN 107.5 MHz) is an FM station owned and operated by Iddes Broadcast Group. Its studios and transmitter are located at 3/F, Kingsheen Bldg., Don Mariano Marcos Ave., Roxas, Isabela.

References

External links
Win FM FB Page

Radio stations in Isabela (province)
Radio stations established in 2001